Isame Faciane (born May 11, 1991) is a former American football guard. He played college football as a defensive tackle at Florida International and was signed by the Minnesota Vikings as an undrafted free agent in 2014. He has also spent time with the Buffalo Bills and Houston Roughnecks.

Professional career

Minnesota Vikings
Faciane signed with the Minnesota Vikings as an undrafted free agent on May 10, 2014. Faciane chose the Vikings because the defensive line coach was Andre Patterson, his former assistant coach at Florida International. On August 30, 2014, he was waived by the Vikings and was signed to the practice squad the next day. He signed a reserve/future contract with the Vikings on December 30, 2014.

In 2015, Faciane made the transition from defensive tackle to offensive guard. On September 5, 2015, he was waived by the Vikings and signed to the practice squad the next day. He signed a reserve/future contract with the Vikings on January 11, 2016.

On September 3, 2016, Faciane was again released by the Vikings as part of final roster cuts and signed to the practice squad the next day. He was released on October 18, 2016 following a DWI arrest.

Buffalo Bills
On November 30, 2016, Faciane was signed to the Buffalo Bills' practice squad.

Miami Dolphins
On August 5, 2017, Faciane signed with the Miami Dolphins. He was waived on September 2, 2017 for then to play to play the guard position.

Iowa Barnstormers
On January 30, 2018, Faciane signed with the Iowa Barnstormers of the Indoor Football League.

Houston Roughnecks
In October 2019, Faciane was drafted by the XFL to play for the Houston Roughnecks. He was waived on February 19, 2020. He signed to the Team 9 practice squad, and then was re-signed by the Roughnecks on March 9, 2020. He had his contract terminated when the league suspended operations on April 10, 2020.

References

External links
FIU Panthers football bio
Minnesota Vikings bio

Living people
American football offensive guards
American football defensive tackles
FIU Panthers football players
1991 births
Players of American football from Louisiana
People from Slidell, Louisiana
Minnesota Vikings players
Buffalo Bills players
Miami Dolphins players
Iowa Barnstormers players
Toronto Argonauts  players
Hamilton Tiger-Cats players
Houston Roughnecks players
Canadian football offensive linemen
Team 9 players